Albrecht von Graefe may refer to:
 Albrecht von Graefe (ophthalmologist) (1828-1870), Prussian opthalmologist
 Albrecht von Graefe (politician) (1868-1933), German politician and landowner